Peter Blankenborg Prydz (21 September 1776 – 6 March 1827 ) was a Norwegian military officer and representative at the Norwegian Constituent Assembly conducted at Eidsvoll during 1814. .

He was born in the neighborhood of Abelsøe in the Østensjø district of  Oslo, Norway. He was the son of Anne Hedevig Brochmann (1752-1834) and Hans Prydz (1751-1781), and had three brothers. He was a great-grandfather of the politician Hans Prydz (1868-1957).

He began his military career as a commissioned officer at Nordenfjeldske infantry regiment. He rose to the rank of Major in 1825, before dying the next year.

Peter Blankenborg Prydz was elected to the Norwegian Constituent Assembly in 1814, representing the army regiment Nordenfjeldske Infanteri-Regiment. At Eidsvoll, he belonged to the independence party (Selvstendighetspartiet).

He is buried at Skedsmo Kirke, a cruciform church from 1180 in Lillestrøm municipality in Viken county.

References

Related Reading
 Holme Jørn (2014) De kom fra alle kanter - Eidsvollsmennene og deres hus  (Oslo: Cappelen Damm) 

1776 births
1826 deaths
Military personnel from Oslo
Fathers of the Constitution of Norway
Norwegian Army personnel
Norwegian military personnel of the Napoleonic Wars